Forrest Hall (October 29, 1921 – February 14, 2001) was an American football running back and return specialist who played in the American Football League. He played college football at San Francisco.

College career
Hall originally attended Duquesne University on a basketball scholarship. He played both basketball and football for two seasons before joining the Army Air Force during World War Two. In 1942, he rushed for a 60-yard touchdown to beat Villanova in a 6–0 upset victory. Hall played football for the Fourth Air Force's football team and eventually went to the East-West Shrine Game as the branch's representative. After the war, Hall enrolled at the University of San Francisco using the GI Bill and joined the San Francisco Dons football team. In his first season with the team, Hall set an NCAA record with 36.2 yards per kickoff return and was named All-Pacific Coast by the Associated Press.

Professional career
Hall was selected in the ninth round of the 1945 NFL Draft by the Philadelphia Eagles while still in the military. After graduating from San Francisco, Hall signed with the San Francisco 49ers of the All-America Football Conference. In his lone season with the 49ers, Hall rushed for 413 yards and two touchdowns on 66 carries while catching four passes for 87 yards and returning 13 kickoffs for 369 yards and three punts for 97 yards. He was retroactively named All-Pro by the Professional Football Researchers Association and NFL commissioner Pete Rozelle referred to him as his "personal favorite" 49er in the foreword to a book on the team in 1986. Hall played briefly for the Erie Vets of the American Association in 1950 before retiring from football.

Post-football life
Hall worked part-time as an electrician while playing and began working full-time after his playing career ended until retiring when he was 65. Hall died on February 14, 2001.

References

External links
San Francisco Dons Hall of Fame bio

1921 births
2001 deaths
San Francisco Dons football players
Players of American football from Pennsylvania
San Francisco 49ers (AAFC) players
American football running backs
American football return specialists
People from Oil City, Pennsylvania
Duquesne Dukes men's basketball players
Duquesne Dukes football players
United States Army Air Forces personnel of World War II
San Francisco 49ers players